Boletus regineus, commonly known as the queen bolete, is an edible and highly regarded fungus of the genus Boletus that inhabits southwestern North America. It was considered a variant of the similarly edible B. edulis for many years until declared a unique species in 2008.  Phylogenetic analysis has shown B. regineus as a member of a clade, or closely related group, with B. subcaerulescens, Gastroboletus subalpinus, B. pinophilus, B. fibrillosus, and B. rex-veris.

The stalk is 5–15 cm long, 3–6 cm wide, clavate then equal, and whitish tan.

See also
List of Boletus species

References

External links

Edible fungi
Fungi described in 2008
regineus
Fungi of North America